Gustaw Teofil Holoubek (21 April 1923 – 6 March 2008) was a Polish actor, director, member of the Polish Sejm, and a senator.

Holoubek participated in the September Campaign and was a prisoner of war during the Nazi German Occupation of Poland. His father was a Czech immigrant who settled in Poland after the First World War, and his mother was Polish.

Holoubek had his first role as an actor in 1947, thus beginning his lifelong career in theatre and film in Poland and abroad. His political career began in 1976, when he was elected to the Sejm, the lower house of the Polish Parliament. He was re-elected in 1980, but resigned in 1981 when martial law was declared. In 1989, he was elected to the Senate, the upper house. That same year, he took a position as a professor at the Academy of Theatre in Warsaw. Holoubek was a recipient of the Order of Polonia Restituta (Knight's Cross, Commander's Cross with Star, Grand Cross).

Selected filmography

1953: The Soldier of Victory (Żołnierz zwycięstwa) - Feliks Dzierzynski
1955: Blekitny krzyz - Narrator (voice)
1956: Tajemnica dzikiego szybu - Class teacher Sadej
1958: The Noose (Pętla) - Kuba Kowalski
1958: Farewells (Pożegnania) - Mirek
1959: Bialy niedzwiedz - Henryk Fogiel
1960: Wspólny pokój (Roomers) - Dziadzia
1960: Kolorowe ponczochy - Educator
1961: Marysia i krasnoludki
1961: Rozstanie (Goodbye to the Past)
1961: Time Past (Czas przeszły) - Von steinhagen
1961: Story of the Golden Boot(Historia żółtej ciżemki) - Wit Stwosz
1962: Opening Tomorrow (Jutro premiera) - Zenon Wiewiórski
1962: Spóznieni przechodnie - Edward (segment "Czas przybliza, czas oddala")
1962: Slantzeto i syankata - Znamenitiyat aktyor
1962: Cafe from the Past (Spotkanie w "Bajce") - Doctor Pawel
1963: Gangsters and Philanthropists (Gangsterzy i filantropi) - Professor
1963: Yesterday in Fact (Naprawdę wczoraj) - Captain Stolyp
1964: The Law and the Fist (Prawo i piesc) - Andrzej Kenig
1965: The Saragossa Manuscript (Rękopis znaleziony w Saragossie) - Don Pedro Velasquez
1965: Salto - Host
1965: The Moment of Peace (Les rideaux blancs)
1966: Maria and Napoleon (Marysia i Napoleon) - Napoleon Bonaparte - Napoleon Beranger
1969: Pan Wolodyjowski
1969: Gra - Husband
1970: Salt of the Black Earth (Sól ziemi czarnej) - Narrator (voice, uncredited)
1971: Pejzaz z bohaterem - Rafal Wilczewski, History Teacher
1971: Dzieciol - Thief (voice, uncredited)
1971: Goya or the Hard Way to Enlightenment (Goya – oder der arge Weg der Erkenntnis) - Bermudez
1972: How Far, How Near (Jak daleko stad, jak blisko) - Maks
1973: The Hour-Glass Sanatorium (Sanatorium pod klepsydrą) - Dr. Gotard
1978: A Room with a View on the Se (Pokój z widokiem na morze) - Profesor Jan Leszczynski
1978: Hospital of the Transfiguration (Szpital przemienienia) - Writer Zygmunt Sekulowski
1981: W bialy dzien - Judge
1981: Childish Questions (Dziecinne Pytania) - Professor
1982: Limuzyna Daimler-Benz - Maks Felinski, Michal's Godfather
1983: An Uneventful Story (Nieciekawa historia) - Professor
1984: W starym dworku czyli niepodleglosc trójkatów - Tadeusz
1985: Zabicie ciotki
1985: Write and Fight (Pismak) - Investigator
1986: Jezioro Bodenskie - Roullot
1986: Siegfried (Zygfryd) - Stefan Drawicz
1986: Weryfikacja - Gucio Nawrot
1988: Niezwykla podróz Baltazara Kobera - (voice)
1989: A Tale of Adam Mickiewicz's 'Forefathers' Eve' (Lawa. Opowiesc o 'Dziadach' Adama Mickiewicza) - Hermit / Ghost / Gustaw-Konrad / Poet
1990: The Master and Margarita (Mistrz i Małgorzata) (TV Series) - Woland
1994: Oczy niebieskie - Profesor Ani i Jacka
1995: Awantura o Basie - Professor Somer
1997: Ksiega wielkich zyczen - Adam Ostrowski
1999: With Fire and Sword (Ogniem i mieczem) - Senator Kisiel
2000: A Very Christmas Story (Świąteczna przygoda) - Good (voice)
2001: Listy milosne - Teresa's Father

References

External links 
 Gustaw Holoubek at Culture.pl

1923 births
2008 deaths
Male actors from Kraków
People from Kraków Voivodeship (1919–1939)
Polish people of Czech descent
Members of the Polish Sejm 1976–1980
Members of the Polish Sejm 1980–1985
Members of the Senate of Poland 1989–1991
Polish theatre directors
Polish male stage actors
Polish male film actors
Polish male voice actors
20th-century Polish male actors
Members of the Polish Academy of Learning
Polish military personnel of World War II
Recipients of the Order of Polonia Restituta (1944–1989)
Recipients of the Order of the Banner of Work
Grand Crosses of the Order of Polonia Restituta
Recipients of the Gold Medal for Merit to Culture – Gloria Artis
Recipients of the Pro Memoria Medal
Politicians from Kraków
Recipients of the State Award Badge (Poland)
Recipients of the Order of the White Eagle (Poland)